10 TV may refer to:

 10TV, an Indian news television channel
 Digi24, a Romanian news television channel
 WBNS-TV, an American television channel
 Network 10, formerly known as 10 TV Australia